Morana may refer to:
 Moraña, a municipality in Galicia, Spain
 Morana Dam, an earthfill dam on Morana river near Patan, Satara district in the state of Maharashtra in India
 Marzanna, Slavic goddess of death
 Morana (film), a 1994 Slovenian film
 Morana Sharp, 1874, a genus of pselaphid beetles
 Morana (goddess), a Slavic goddess of death and rebirth